Bintang Delapan Group is one of the largest mining companies based in Indonesia. It mines minerals and smelts metals in Indonesia, the Solomon Islands and Myanmar, and partly owns the Indonesia Morowali Industrial Park.

Organization 
Bintang is one of the largest mining companies in Indonesia. Boby Tejakusuma is the Chief Executive Officer.

The company has close connections to the Indonesian National Armed Forces.

History 
Bintang invested US$1 billion in a partnership  with Tsingshan Holding Group to build Indonesia Morowali Industrial Park (IMIP) nickel processing facility in Central Sulawesi which opened in 2015. IMIP employs 30,000 people and operates 20 smelters. As of 2022, Bintang was a 33.75% shareholder in IMIP.

Also in 2015, the Morowali Regency administration accused the company of operating its' Bahodopi mining operations without the necessary Environmental Impact Analysis permit.

Assets 
Bintang Mining Company owns a bauxite mine in Rennell Island, Solomon Islands. 

Bintang Delapan Group operates a Nickel smelting facilities in Myanmar.

References

External links 

 Official website

Mining companies of Indonesia
Nickel mining in Indonesia
Nickel mining companies